The Trenton Tigers were a Class-B minor league baseball team that played in the Tri-State League between 1907 and 1914 and the 1908 Pennsylvania-New Jersey League. They represented the city of Trenton, New Jersey.

Defunct minor league baseball teams
Sports in Trenton, New Jersey
1907 establishments in New Jersey
1914 disestablishments in New Jersey
Baseball teams established in 1907
Baseball teams disestablished in 1914
Defunct baseball teams in New Jersey
Defunct Tri-State League teams
Pennsylvania-New Jersey League teams